Miss Polski 2011 was the 22nd Miss Polski pageant, held on August 27, 2011. The winner was Angelika Ogryzek of West Pomerania. In addition to receiving the title Ogryzek also received a Kia Picanto. Ogryzek represented Poland in Miss World 2011, Miss Supranational 2013 and Miss Grand International 2014.

Final results

Special Awards

Judges
Agata Szewioła - Miss Polski 2010
Izabella Miko - Actress, Model
Artur Partyka - Former High Jumper
Gerhard Parzutka von Lipiński - President of the Miss Polski competition

Finalists

Notes

Withdrawals
 Łódź
 Lubusz

Did not compete
 Opole
 Subcarpathia
 Polish Community in Argentina
 Polish Community in Belarus
 Polish Community in Brazil
 Polish Community in Canada
 Polish Community in France
 Polish Community in Ireland
 Polish Community in Israel
 Polish Community in Lithuania
 Polish Community in Russia
 Polish Community in South Africa
 Polish Community in Sweden
 Polish Community in the U.K.
 Polish Community in the U.S.
 Polish Community in Venezuela

References

External links
Official Website

2011
2011 beauty pageants
2011 in Poland